The Qiu Shi Prizes are awarded on an annual basis in recognition of advances in science and technology. The Qiu Shi Science and Technology Foundation was established by Cha Chi Ming (1914–2007) in 1994 in Hong Kong, with the intention of promoting science and technology research in China, and to encourage and reward successful Chinese scientists and scholars. Prizes are awarded each year Prize categories include Physics, Chemistry, Physiology or Medicine, Mathematics or Information Technology.

Qiu Shi (pronounced ch-OO/sh-ER) means "seeking truth". The Qiu Shi Foundation was named after the famous Qiu Shi Academy in Hangzhou, which was subsequently renamed Zhejiang University. Qiu Shi Science and Technology Foundation is not related to the Qiushi Journal, the political theory periodical.

Founder/Foundation 
Cha Chi-ming, GBM, JP, was born in 1914, in Haining County, Jiaxing, Zhejiang province. He studied textile technology and graduated from Zhejiang University in 1931. Cha was best known for his industrial prowess, building a multinational textile conglomerate. He was the chairman of CDW International Limited, The Mingly Corporation Limited and Hong Kong Resort International Limited.

The Qiu Shi Advisory Board 
Members:

Chen Ning Yang (a Nobel laureate in physics),
Zhou Guangzhao (physician, and honorary chairman of China Association for Science and Technology),
Yuan T. Lee (a Nobel laureate in chemistry),
Yuet Wai Kan (genetic researcher),
David Ho (physician and innovator of the "cocktail" therapy for HIV),
Andrew Yao (computer scientist and the first Asian A.M. Turing Award recipient).

Prize types 
Alumni

References 
 

Science and technology awards
Science and technology in China